Pushpa Raj Ojha (born 19 August 1959) is a Nepalese sprinter. He competed in the men's 400 metres at the 1984 Summer Olympics.

References

External links
 

1959 births
Living people
Athletes (track and field) at the 1984 Summer Olympics
Nepalese male sprinters
Olympic athletes of Nepal
Place of birth missing (living people)
20th-century Nepalese people